Edward Melvin Porter (May 22, 1930 – July 26, 2016) was an American lawyer, politician, and civil rights activist in the state of Oklahoma.

Biography
Porter was born in 1930 in Okmulgee, Oklahoma. He attended Tennessee State University, Vanderbilt University, and Shorter College. He passed the Oklahoma Bar examination in 1960. A lawyer, Porter had seven children. In 1961, Porter served as president of the Oklahoma City National Association for the Advancement of Colored People.

After an unsuccessful campaign for a seat in the State House in 1962, Porter was elected to the Oklahoma State Senate in 1964 to serve the newly redrawn district 48. He was the first African American to sit in the Oklahoma State Senate. He served until 1987. Porter died on July 26, 2016 at his home in Oklahoma City.

References

1930 births
2016 deaths
People from Okmulgee, Oklahoma
University of Tennessee alumni
Vanderbilt University Law School alumni
Oklahoma lawyers
Democratic Party Oklahoma state senators
African-American state legislators in Oklahoma
20th-century American lawyers